Charlie Cunningham (born 1984) is an English singer-songwriter and guitarist from Buckinghamshire. He has released two studio albums, Lines (2017) and Permanent Way (2019).

Career
In January 2017, Charlie Cunningham released his debut album, Lines on Swedish label Dumont Dumont, including lead single, "Minimum", to critical acclaim, and went on tour in Europe and North America later that year. Lines won the Album Of The Year Award at the Pop Awards 2018. His second album, Permanent Way, was released in May 2019 on BMG.

Awards and nominations

Discography

Studio albums
 Lines (2017)
 Permanent Way (2019)
 Frame (2023)

EPs
 Outside Things EP (2014)
 Breather EP (2015)
 Heights EP (2016)
 Pieces EP (2020)

Singles
 "Minimum" (2017)
 "Permanent Way" (2019)
 "Sink In" (2019)
 "Don't Go Far" (2019)
 "Bite" (2019)
 "Climb" with Sophie Jamieson (2020)

References

External links

 
 Charlie Cunningham - Genius
 Charlie Cunningham - AllMusic

1984 births
Living people
Indie folk musicians
English folk singers
English songwriters
English folk guitarists
People from Bedfordshire
Infectious Music artists